Several space objects and features have been named after Serbian people or things in Serbia. These include planetary features on Mars and Venus, asteroids and exoplanets.

Moon 
 Pupin (crater)

Venus 
 Ivka crater
 Nana crater
 Radmila crater
 Zlata crater

Mars 
 Krupac
 Selevac
 Topola
Jezero

Asteroids 
 1564 Srbija
 1605 Milankovitch
 57868 Pupin

External links 
 http://www.politika.rs/scc/clanak/367029/%D0%A1%D0%BF%D0%B5%D0%BA%D1%82%D0%B0%D1%80/%D0%9F%D0%BE%D1%81%D0%BB%D0%B5-%D0%A2%D0%B5%D1%81%D0%BB%D0%B5-%D0%9C%D0%B8%D0%BB%D0%B0%D0%BD%D0%BA%D0%BE%D0%B2%D0%B8%D1%9B%D0%B0-%D0%B8-%D0%9F%D1%83%D0%BF%D0%B8%D0%BD%D0%B0-%D0%B8-%D0%9A%D1%83%D1%81%D1%82%D1%83%D1%80%D0%B8%D1%86%D0%B0-%D0%B4%D0%BE%D0%B1%D0%B8%D1%98%D0%B0-%D0%BF%D0%BB%D0%B0%D0%BD%D0%B5%D1%82%D1%83

Space program of Serbia
Astronomical nomenclature by nation